Elton and Orston (formerly Elton) railway station serves the villages of Elton on the Hill and Orston in Nottinghamshire, England. It is owned by Network Rail and managed by East Midlands Railway, but now provides minimal rail services.

History
The station lies on the line first opened by the Ambergate, Nottingham, Boston and Eastern Junction Railway. Passenger services began on 15 July 1850. The line was taken over by the Great Northern Railway in 1855. The master's lodge and ticket office building was designed by Thomas Chambers Hine.

From 7 January 1963 passenger steam trains between Grantham, Bottesford, Elton and Orston, Aslockton, Bingham, Radcliffe-on-Trent, Netherfield and Colwick, Nottingham London-road (High Level) and Nottingham (Victoria) were replaced by diesel multiple-unit trains.

Images show how the station looked in 1967. No station buildings by Hine survived by 2008. There is a small 1980s brick-built shelter on one platform. The name of the station was still "Elton" in 1904.

The 2021/22 statistics record only 40 entries/exits at the station, making it Britain’s least used station. It is Nottinghamshire's least used station and is one stop down the line from Leicestershire's least used station, Bottesford.

Services
The station is unstaffed and offers no facilities other than two shelters, bicycle storage, timetables and modern "Help Points". The full range of tickets for travel can be purchased from the guard on the train at no extra cost. There are no retail facilities at the station.

There is one service to Nottingham per day at 07:04 and one service to Skegness per day at 17:12. There is no Sunday service. The service operates on most bank holidays.

References

External links

Web page about the station

Railway stations in Nottinghamshire
DfT Category F2 stations
Former Great Northern Railway stations
Railway stations in Great Britain opened in 1850
Railway stations served by East Midlands Railway
Low usage railway stations in the United Kingdom
Thomas Chambers Hine railway stations